Hulu is an American subscription streaming service majority-owned by The Walt Disney Company, with Comcast's NBCUniversal holding a minority stake (1:2). It was  launched on October 29, 2007 and it offers a library of films and television series from studios including 20th Century Studios, Searchlight Pictures, Disney Television Studios, ABC, Freeform, and FX Networks among others, as well as Hulu original programming.

Hulu was initially established as a joint venture between News Corporation and NBC Universal, Providence Equity Partners, and later The Walt Disney Company, serving as an aggregation of recent episodes of television series from their respective television networks. In 2010, Hulu launched a subscription service, initially branded as "Hulu Plus", which featured full seasons of programs from the companies and other partners, and undelayed access to new episodes. In 2017, the company launched Hulu with Live TV—an over-the-top live TV service featuring linear television channels.

, Hulu has a total of 48 million subscribers in United States and is available in 2 countries: The United States and Japan. Due to the service in Japan being majority controlled by HJ Holdings, Inc., a subsidiary of Nippon TV, since 2014, Disney no longer provides most of its content to Hulu in Japan in order to support its flagship streaming service, Disney+. Thus, Hulu Japan is now considered a virtually separate service from its United States counterpart.

Etymology 
The name Hulu comes from two Mandarin Chinese characters, húlu (葫芦/葫蘆), "calabash; bottle gourd", and hùlù (互录/互錄), "interactive recording".

Jason Kilar, who served as CEO of Hulu, said the name comes from a Chinese proverb:

History

Early years (2007–2010) 
Individuals who were instrumental in the founding of Hulu include Bruce Campbell, Peter Chernin, JB Perrette, Mike Lang, Beth Comstock, George Kliavkoff, Darren Feher, and Jason Kilar. Hulu was announced in March 2007 with AOL, NBC Universal (then co-owned by General Electric and Vivendi), MSN, Myspace, and Yahoo! planned as "initial distribution partners". Jason Kilar was named Hulu CEO in late 2007.

The name Hulu was chosen in late August 2007, when the website went live with an announcement only and no content. It invited users to leave their email addresses for the upcoming beta test. In October 2007, Hulu began the private beta testing by invitation, and later allowed users to invite friends. Hulu launched for public access in the United States on March 12, 2008. The first product to launch was the HULU Syndication network, which was designed and developed by the NBC Universal team from New York, on October 29, 2007, led by Tom Sharma, followed by the Hulu.com destinations site.

Hulu began an advertising campaign during NBC's broadcast of Super Bowl XLIII with an initial ad starring Alec Baldwin titled "Alec in Huluwood". Advertisements have since aired featuring Eliza Dushku, Seth MacFarlane, Denis Leary, and Will Arnett.

In July 2007, Providence Equity Partners, the owner of Newport Television, became one of the earliest "outside" investors by purchasing a 10 percent stake in the company for US$100 million equity investment, before the company was known as "Hulu". With its investment came a seat on the board of directors, where Providence was said to act as an "independent voice on the board". In April 2009, The Walt Disney Company joined the Hulu consortium as a stakeholder, with plans to offer content from ABC, ESPN and Disney Channel.

Multiple joint ventures (2010–2019) 
Early in 2010, Hulu chief executive Jason Kilar said the service had made a profit in two quarters and that the company could top $100 million in revenue by summer 2010, more than its income for all of 2009. ComScore says monthly video streams reached 903 million in January 2010, over three times the figure for a year earlier, and second only to YouTube.

On August 16, 2010, a report revealed that Hulu was planning an initial public offering (IPO) which could value the company at more than $2 billion.

On June 21, 2011, The Wall Street Journal reported that an "unsolicited offer" caused Hulu to begin "weighing whether to sell itself". However, on October 13, 2011, Hulu and its owners announced that they would not sell the company, as none of the bidders offered an amount that was satisfactory to its owners. In September of that year, the service launched in Japan; marking Hulu's first international expansion.

Hulu generated $420 million in revenue in 2011, $80 million short of the company's target. The vacant CEO post was officially filled by former Fox Networks President Mike Hopkins on October 17, 2013.

In October 2012, Providence sold its 10 percent stake to "Hulu's media owners" and ceased participation in the board.

On February 27, 2014, Nippon Television Network Corporation acquired Hulu's Japanese business. The service would retain the "Hulu" brand and technology in Japan under a subsidiary of Nippon as part of a separate agreement.

On August 3, 2016, Time Warner acquired a 10 percent stake of Hulu. On April 15, 2019, AT&T (via WarnerMedia) sold its 9.5% stake in Hulu back to the company for $1.43 billion, in order to shift its focus to its own service, HBO Max.

Hopkins exited and was named Sony Pictures TV Chairman. Fox Networks Group COO Randy Freer was named CEO on October 24, 2017.

Disney majority ownership (2019–present) 
In March 2019, Disney acquired 21st Century Fox, giving it a 60% majority stake in Hulu. AT&T (which acquired Time Warner in 2018) sold back its roughly 10% stake the following month leaving Disney with 67% and Comcast with 33%. Comcast, the only other shareholder, announced on May 14, 2019, that it had agreed to cede its control to Disney, and reached an agreement for Disney to purchase its 33% stake in the company as early as 2024.

On May 14, 2019, Comcast relinquished its control in Hulu to Disney effective immediately. As a result, the streaming service became a division of Walt Disney Direct-to-Consumer & International (DTCI) with Comcast effectively becoming a silent partner. Under the agreement, Comcast's 33% stake can be sold to Disney at fair market value as early as 2024. The fair market value will be determined at that time, but Disney guaranteed a minimum valuation of the entire company at $27.5 billion (valuing the Comcast stake as worth at least $9.075 billion). Randy Freer would report to Disney executive Kevin Mayer.

In the wake of the deal, Disney CEO Bob Iger explained that direct integration of Hulu with Disney's studios would allow increased investments in original content, which would in turn allow it to "make the service even more compelling and a greater value for consumers". Disney stated that its control of Hulu was the third major component of its direct-to-consumer strategy, complementing its sports streaming service ESPN+, and its then-forthcoming Disney+. Hulu would be oriented towards "general" entertainment and content targeting mature audiences. NBCUniversal will continue to license its content to the service through at least 2024, but it will have the option to begin transitioning its exclusivity deals with Hulu to non-exclusive terms beginning in 2020, and to end other content deals beginning in 2022.

On July 31, 2019, Disney reorganized Hulu's reporting structure, placing Hulu's Scripted Originals team under Walt Disney Television. Under the new structure, Hulu's SVP of Original Scripted Content would report directly to the chairman of Disney Television Studios and ABC Entertainment. As of November 2019, FX and Fox Searchlight were assigned to supply Hulu with content. In January 2020, Disney eliminated the role of Hulu CEO, with its top executives to report directly to DTCI and Walt Disney Television. On January 31, 2020, Freer resigned as CEO of Hulu and the position was eliminated; Hulu's top executives now report directly to DTCI and Walt Disney Television.

In June 2021, it was reported that Comcast had accused Disney of undermining Hulu's growth and value by not engaging in international expansion of the service, having instead added the Star brand as an extension of Disney+ in selected markets. In August 2021, Disney CEO Bob Chapek suggested that Hulu, Disney+, and ESPN+ could similarly be merged in the future, citing that the existing bundle offering of the services had a lower rate of churn than the individual services, but in the U.S. "there may also be certain constraints that we're under that could at least, from a short-term standpoint, limit our ability to do what long term we might feel was ideal, but frankly we don't know what’s ideal yet."

On September 7, 2021, Hulu announced that the prices of its main video on-demand and ad-free plans would increase by $1 each to $6.99 and $12.99 per-month beginning October 8. In October 2021, Hulu president Kelly Campbell resigned, and was subsequently appointed the president of NBCUniversal's competing service Peacock. In its third-quarter earnings report, Comcast CFO Mike Cavanagh stated of Hulu that they were "happy to be along for that ride", and projected that "It’ll be fine if we stay until the end because I expect the value to keep increasing."

On November 22, 2021, Disney and WarnerMedia reached a deal to let select 20th Century Studios and Searchlight Pictures films stream on Disney+, Hulu and HBO Max in 2022. On the same day, The Wall Street Journal reported that Comcast was considering pulling some content from Hulu to boost their Peacock streaming service. On March 4, 2022, it was reported that NBCUniversal will pull content from Hulu and move them to Peacock, beginning in September. In January 2022, Joe Earley became president of Hulu.

In September 2022, Chapek indicated that Disney is considering merging Hulu into Disney+ because the model had been successful outside the United States without any content friction. To accelerate the plan, he said that Disney would love to buy out Comcast's 33.3% stake in Hulu earlier than their previously agreed 2024 timeline. However, Comcast had not offered reasonable terms for an early buyout and had instead expressed interest in buying Hulu themselves if it were for sale.

Content

Original content 

From January 17, 2011, to April 24, 2014, Hulu streamed its own in-house web series The Morning After, a light-hearted pop-culture news show. It was produced by Hulu in conjunction with Jace Hall's HDFilms and stars Brian Kimmet and Ginger Gonzaga. Producing the show was a first for the company, which in the past has been primarily a content distributor.

On January 16, 2012, Hulu announced that it would be airing its first original script based program, titled Battleground, which premiered in February 2012. The program aired on Hulu's free web service rather than on the subscription-based Hulu Plus. Battleground is described as a documentary-style political drama.

Later that same month, Hulu announced it would air The Fashion Fund, a six-part reality series, and the winner of the show would receive $300,000 to start their career.

To continue with its original programming movement, Hulu announced that there would be a total of seven original programs that were planned to air on its service: Battleground, Day in the Life, and Up to Speed were previously mentioned; and on April 19, Hulu added four more shows to its list: Don't Quit Your Daydream, Flow, The Awesomes, and We Got Next. Some of these programs began airing in 2012, while others premiered over the next few years.

On May 21, 2012, Hulu announced it would be bringing Kevin Smith to its lineup of original programming. Smith hosts a movie discussion show titled Spoilers, which began airing in mid-2012.

In March 2016, Lionsgate Premiere and Hulu jointly acquired distribution rights to the film Joshy, which was later released on August 12, 2016.

On May 4, 2016, Hulu acquired The Beatles: Eight Days a Week, as its first documentary acquisition, as part of a planned Hulu Documentary Films collection. The film premiered theatrically on September 15, before debuting on the streaming service on September 17.

Since September 2022, selected International programs that released on Disney+’s Star Hub and Disney+ original International content that is over the rating limit (maximum TV-14 and PG-13) in United States market begins to release on Hulu.

Content partners 
Following the start of its service, Hulu signed deals with several new content providers making additional material available to consumers. On April 30, 2009, The Walt Disney Company announced that it would join the venture, purchasing a 27 percent stake in Hulu.

Starting August 15, 2011, viewers of content from Fox and related networks are required to authenticate paid cable or satellite service wherever Fox streams episodes, including on Hulu, to be able to watch them the morning after the first airing. Non-subscribers will see those episodes delayed a week before they are viewable.

On October 28, 2011, Hulu announced that they had inked a five-year deal with The CW, giving the streaming site access to next-day content from five of the six major networks. On September 18, 2013, Hulu announced a multi-year deal with the BBC that would deliver 2,000 episodes from 144 different titles in the first 12 months.

In 2015, Hulu began offering content from Showtime for an additional $8.99/month, which is cheaper than Showtime's own streaming service. On June 16, 2016, Hulu announced a deal with the Disney-ABC Television Group for the exclusive SVOD rights to past seasons of seven Disney Channel, Disney Junior and Disney XD series, and more than 20 Disney Channel original movies.

The CW's agreement with Hulu ended September 18, 2016; in-season streaming of current CW programs moved to the network's own digital platforms, and Netflix began to carry past seasons of The CW's programs through 2019. , a limited amount of content from CBS's library is available on-demand, mostly limited to shows that are no longer producing new episodes. On January 4, 2017, it was reported that a deal was reached to bring live broadcasts of CBS and several affiliated channels to Hulu's upcoming live streaming service as well as to make more shows available on-demand.

In April 2018, Hulu announced a partnership with Spotify that allows users to purchase both streaming services for a discounted price per month. This discount also includes an even larger discounted rate for university students.

Hulu distributes video on its own website and syndicates its hosting to other sites, and allows users to embed Hulu clips on their websites. In addition to NBC, ABC and Fox programs and movies, Hulu carries shows from networks:  A&E, Big Ten Network, Bravo, E!, Fox Sports 2, FX, PBS, NFL Network, Oxygen, RT America, Fox Sports 1, SundanceTV, Syfy, USA Network, NBCSN, and online comedy sources such as Onion News Network. Hulu retains between thirty and fifty percent of advertising revenue generated by the shows it distributes.

In November 2009, Hulu also began to establish partnerships with record labels to host music videos and concert performances on the site, including EMI in November 2009, and Warner Music Group in December 2009.

In early March 2010, Viacom announced that it was pulling two of the website's most popular shows, The Colbert Report and The Daily Show, off Hulu. The programs had been airing on Hulu since late 2008. A spokesman for Viacom noted that "in the current economic model, there is not that much in it for us to continue at this time. If they can get to the point where the monetization model is better, then we may go back." In February 2011, both shows were made available for streaming on Hulu again. The Daily Show was again removed from Hulu in March 2017 in order to push viewers to watch the program on Viacom and Comedy Central's apps.

In 2012, Viz Media, Aniplex of America, and other distributors teamed up to create Neon Alley. It had launched on October 2, 2012, as a 24/7 web channel, but in 2014 it had switched to Hulu-only. The site contained exclusive dub premieres with anime such as Accel World, Blue Exorcist, Magi: The Labyrinth of Magic, Fate/Zero and the uncut version of Sailor Moon. It also had shows such as Naruto and Naruto: Shippuden, Death Note, Inuyasha, Bakuman, Ranma ½, One Piece, One Punch Man, and Bleach. It went defunct on May 4, 2016. However, Hulu still hosts over 300 anime from Funimation, Aniplex of America, Viz Media, and Sentai Filmworks, and selected anime began resume to release on Hulu following the deal between Disney and Sony Pictures since 2021.

In April 2017, Hulu signed a first-run license deal with Annapurna Pictures. Hulu also has output deals with IFC Films and Magnolia Pictures.

New releases from 20th Century Studios will not immediately be available on either Disney+ or Hulu, as it has an existing output deal with HBO until 2022.

Hulu in May 2018 announced its first-ever license deal with DreamWorks Animation, becoming the exclusive streaming home for future DWA movies feature films, as well as library films. DWA had streamed exclusively through Netflix since 2013. Films will be available on the service in 2019, while original series will be available later in 2020.

In October 2018, PocketWatch launched 90 22-minute episodes of repackaged content from their YouTube creator partners on Hulu and Amazon Prime Video and partnered with Paramount Pictures to license them to international distributors.

On December 4, 2018, Hulu confirmed an exclusive multi-year first-look SVOD deal with Funimation.

In June 2019, Hulu and FX signed an output deal with Lionsgate, where Hulu and FX would respectably gain the streaming and TV rights to films released under the Lionsgate label in 2020 and 2021.

In August 2019, Hulu agreed to control the streaming rights to upcoming films released by Bleecker Street.

On March 2, 2020, Hulu launched a dedicated "hub" for content from FX branded as "FX on Hulu", with the service becoming the exclusive streaming outlet for current and past series from the network. Beginning with Breeders, new episodes of FX original series also become available on Hulu immediately after their television airing, and selected series will also premiere exclusively on the service.

On January 14, 2021, it was announced that following an exclusive 3-week IMAX engagement, Searchlight's Nomadland would be released on Hulu alongside a regular limited theatrical and drive-in run in the United States on February 19.

On April 21, 2021, Disney reached a deal for television and streaming rights to Sony Pictures films from 2022 through 2026, which includes library rights for some of its franchises like Spider-Man, Jumanji and Hotel Transylvania franchises, etc., and licensing anime under Funimation and Crunchyroll brands and anime released by Aniplex of America, and post-pay-one window rights to new releases (after their exclusivity period with Netflix expires). This deal covers Disney+, Hulu, and Disney's television channels. On May 17, 2021, it started Onyx Collective which is a content brand for creators.

On August 31, 2021, Disney announced that it would fold the U.S. version of Hotstar—a niche streaming service targeting Indian Americans—in late-2022, with its original entertainment content migrating to Hulu. Since August 2021, Star India Networks programming has been available to Hulu subscribers.

Services

Hulu on demand service 
Hulu's subscription service was launched in beta (preview) on June 29, 2010, and officially launched on November 17, 2010, under the branding Hulu Plus.  The service remained advertising-supported, but it offers an expanded content library including full seasons, day-after access to current season content and more episodes of shows available. Hulu also launched Hulu Plus apps on other types of devices, including mobile, digital media players, and video game consoles. By the end of 2011, Hulu Plus had around 1.5 million subscribers.

On April 29, 2015, it was announced that the "Hulu Plus" branding would be discontinued, and that the service would be henceforth marketed as simply "Hulu" to place it in-line with its subscription-only competitors. By then, the service had grown to 9 million subscribers.

The Wall Street Journal reported in July 2015 that Hulu was exploring an advertising-free subscription option for around $12 to $14 a month. This was confirmed as going forward , with a "No Commercials" plan priced at $11.99, $4 more than the $7.99 monthly rate for a "Limited Commercials" subscription, though a few highlighted network series (fewer than 10) would retain pre-roll and post-roll ad pods. Starting in 2019, Hulu plans to begin displaying on-screen ads when the viewer pauses the show, although it is unclear whether this will apply to customers on the $11.99/month No Ads plan.

In May 2016, Hulu announced that it had reached 12 million subscribers. In January 2018, Hulu announced that it had reached 17 million subscribers.

On August 8, 2016, Hulu announced that it would discontinue its free video on-demand content, and syndicate it to Yahoo! on a new website known as Yahoo! View. This service featured recent episodes of ABC, Fox, and NBC series until its 2019 discontinuation. The Hulu website is now devoted exclusively to the subscription service.

In May 2018, Hulu introduced 5.1 surround sound on select devices for its original content. In December 2016 Hulu began streaming content in 4K, also limited to its original content. 4K video was quietly rolled back in 2018, and reintroduced in July 2019. Hulu added HDR for some of its original content in August 2021.

On January 23, 2019, Hulu announced a $2 price drop for the basic ad-supported plan to $5.99. The $5.99 monthly plan has previously been offered as a promotional offer since late 2017 where users that signed up (or reactivated accounts that had previously ended their service) during the offer period would keep the price for an entire year before paying the regular rate.

Since the launch of Disney+ in November 2019, the service has been available in the United States in a bundle with Hulu and ESPN+, priced at US$12.99 per-month for the ad-supported tier of Hulu, and US$18.99 for the ad-free tier of Hulu.

On September 7, 2021, Disney announced that Hulu will be getting a price increase on October 8, 2021. The ad-supported Hulu plan will increase from $5.99 to $6.99 a month, while the ad-free Hulu plan will increase from $11.99 to $12.99 a month. The Hulu live TV plan and the Disney bundle, which includes Disney+, Hulu with ads and ESPN+ for $13.99 a month, will not get a price increase at this time.

Hulu + Live TV service 
On May 4, 2016, Hulu announced that it planned to begin offering an over-the-top "live programming from broadcast and cable brands" some time in 2017. On November 1, 2016, co-owners 21st Century Fox, including Fox Networks Group (Fox, Fox Sports, Fox News Channel, FX Networks, and National Geographic) and The Walt Disney Company, including Disney–ABC Television Group and ESPN Inc. (ABC, Disney Channel, Disney Junior, Disney XD, Freeform, ESPN, ESPN2, ESPNU, SEC Network, and ESPN3) agreed to supply their channels to the streaming service, joined by Time Warner, including Turner Broadcasting System (TBS, TNT, Turner Classic Movies, TruTV, CNN, HLN, CNN International, Cartoon Network, Adult Swim, and Boomerang) on August 3, 2016, which previously reached an agreement with Hulu.

The service, originally marketed as "Hulu with Live TV," launched in beta on May 3, 2017, along with NBCUniversal (Bravo, Cozi TV, NBC, Oxygen, SYFY, Sprout, and Telemundo), A+E Networks (A&E, History, and Lifetime), CBS Corporation (CBS, Pop TV, Smithsonian Channel, and Showtime), and Scripps Networks Interactive (Cooking Channel, Food Network, and HGTV). It was later renamed to "Hulu + Live TV." The service included live streams of more than 75 broadcast and cable-originated channels, including feeds of the five major broadcast networks – ABC, CBS, NBC, Fox and The CW – as well as cable channels owned by Hulu co-parents Comcast's NBCUniversal and The Walt Disney Company, along with NFL Network, Paramount Global with Showtime, A+E Networks, Fox Corporation, Warner Bros. Discovery with HBO, Cinemax, and Starz available as add-ons for an extra fee. Hulu representatives stated that it intends to negotiate carriage agreements with independently owned broadcasting groups to gain distribution rights to local stations from additional markets.

By May 2018, the service had reached 800,000 subscribers.

On November 29, 2018, Hulu + Live TV now adds Discovery Networks (Discovery, TLC, MotorTrend, Animal Planet and Investigation Discovery) for the prices on the bundles featuring the new channels won't change, Discovery will be joining Scripps Networks Interactive. While the $40 per month Hulu With Live TV core package will get the five aforementioned channels, more of Discovery brand channels will also be available through add-on packages. Destination America, Discovery Family, Science Channel, Discovery Life, and American Heroes Channel are in the Entertainment add-on for $7.99 per month. Discovery en Español and Discovery Familia have been added to the $4.99-per-month Spanish language package.

In the third quarter of 2019, Hulu overtook Sling TV as the top OTT pay television service in the United States, with 2.7 million subscribers.

The service was initially priced at $39.99 per-month. In December 2019, the price had been increased to $54.99 per month (after having previously been raised to $44.99).

In November 2020, the rate for Hulu + Live TV increased to $64.99 per month. Along with the ad-free plan with Live TV included, which is now $70.99.

On January 19, 2021, Nexstar's NewsNation launched on Hulu + Live TV.

On April 30, 2021, the service added nine ViacomCBS (now Paramount) networks (BET, Comedy Central, MTV, Nickelodeon, Paramount Network, VH1, CMT, Nick Jr., and TV Land) to the base package, along with BET Her, MTV2, MTV Classic, Nicktoons and TeenNick on the Entertainment add-on.

On November 10, 2021, Disney stated that Hulu + Live TV had reached four million subscribers.

On December 21, 2021, Unlimited DVR, Disney+ and ESPN+ will be included with Hulu + Live TV moving forward, but the price of the service will be increased by $5.

On November 14, 2022, Hulu announced that it had added The Weather Channel and Comedy.TV on November 1 and Hallmark Channel and Hallmark Movies & Mysteries effective November 14. Hallmark Drama also became available in the Entertainment Add-On. Hulu also announced that on December 1, 2022, five Vevo music video channels will be launched, along with theGrio Television Network, JusticeCentral.TV, and The Weather Channel en Español.

Viewership 
Viewership numbers for the site are tracked by measurement firms such as ComScore, Nielsen ratings, and Quantcast. In partnership with comScore, Hulu is the first digital company to receive multi-platform measurement at an individual level that includes co-viewing for living room devices.

The reliability of these metrics has been drawn into question, partly due to widely divergent estimates. For example, between May and June 2010, ComScore updated its scoring methodology and its estimates for Hulu. Hulus viewers would go from 43.5 million to 24 million in one month. In a comScore digital trends report in 2010, comScore's Digital Year in Review report found that Hulu was watched twice as much as viewers who watched on the websites of the five major TV networks combined.

Hulu in May 2018 announced it has surpassed 20 million subscribers in the United States. The tally, which puts the company about 36 million subscriptions behind Netflix, was disclosed at a media presentation at the newly named Hulu Theater at Madison Square Garden in New York. Hulu said it has grown total engagement by more than 60%, with 78% of viewing taking place in the living room on connected TVs.

Awards 
Hulu original series The Handmaid's Tale won two awards at the 33rd annual Television Critics Association Awards for Program of the Year and Outstanding Achievement in Drama. At the 69th Primetime Emmy Awards, Hulu earned a total of eight awards for the series and became the first streaming service to win Outstanding Drama Series. The Handmaid's Tale also received Emmys for Outstanding Directing, Outstanding Writing, Outstanding Cinematography and Outstanding Production Design. Elisabeth Moss won the Emmy for Outstanding Lead Actress, and Ann Dowd the award for Outstanding Supporting Actress. At the 75th Golden Globe Awards The Handmaid's Tale took home two awards, Best TV Drama and Best Actress in a Drama TV Series (Elisabeth Moss).

At the 2016 Critics' Choice Documentary Awards, Hulu's first-released documentary, The Beatles: Eight Days A Week – The Touring Years won the award for Best Music Documentary. The documentary also received Grammy Award for Best Music Film at the 2017 Grammy Awards and Best Documentary at the 16th Annual Movies for Grownups Awards. At the Creative Arts Emmys, the documentary earned two Emmys including Outstanding Sound Editing and Outstanding Sound Mixing.

At the 68th Primetime Emmy Awards, Hulu received its first Emmy Award nominations for its Original series, 11.22.63 and for Triumph's Election Special 2016. In 2016, Hulu received its first Golden Globe nomination for its original series Casual for TV series, Comedy.

In 2020, Hulu original series The Bravest Knight won the GLAAD Media Award for Outstanding Kids and Family Programming.

U.S. News & World Report ranked Hulu its 'Best Live Streaming Service' of 2022.

References

External links 
 

 
2007 establishments in California
Android (operating system) software
Companies based in Santa Monica, California
Former AT&T subsidiaries
Former General Electric subsidiaries
Former News Corporation subsidiaries
Former Time Warner subsidiaries
Former Vivendi subsidiaries
Internet properties established in 2007
Internet television streaming services
IOS software
NBCUniversal
Nippon TV
Nippon News Network
PlayStation 4 software
PlayStation 5 software
Subscription video on demand services
The Walt Disney Company subsidiaries
Toho
Z Holdings
Xbox One software
Xbox Series X and Series S software